Ina Duscha (born 1935) is a former Austrian film actress. After marrying in 1963, she retired from the German film industry.

Selected filmography
 Labyrinth (1959)
 I Will Always Be Yours (1960)
 You Don't Shoot at Angels (1960)
 Beloved Augustin (1960)
 The Avenger (1960)
 Three Men in a Boat (1961)
 Venusberg (1963)

References

Bibliography
 Bergfelder, Tim. International Adventures: German Popular Cinema and European Co-Productions in the 1960s. Berhahn Books, 2005.

External links

1935 births
Living people
Austrian film actresses
20th-century Austrian actresses
People from Styria